Danil Ivanovich Novikov (born 26 December 2002) is a Russian football player. He plays for FC Kaluga.

Club career
He made his debut in the Russian Football National League for FC Yenisey Krasnoyarsk on 27 September 2020 in a game against FC Krasnodar-2.

References

External links
 
 Profile by Russian Football National League

2002 births
Living people
Russian footballers
Association football forwards
FC Yenisey Krasnoyarsk players